Connor Doherty (born 18 July 2000) is an English professional rugby union player who plays as a centre for Premiership Rugby club Sale Sharks.

Rugby career
Doherty was educated at Saint Ambrose College. He started playing rugby as a junior at Altrincham Kersal. He joined the academy of Sale Sharks and in November 2017 made his professional club debut in an Anglo-Welsh Cup game against Worcester Warriors at the age of seventeen.

Doherty was part of the England Sevens side who won a silver medal at the 2017 Commonwealth Youth Games in The Bahamas. He was a member of the England under-20 squad that finished fifth at the 2019 World Rugby Under 20 Championship. The following year saw him score the winning try against Scotland during the 2020 Six Nations Under 20s Championship.

References

External links
Sale Sharks Profile
ESPN Profile
Ultimate Rugby Profile

2000 births
Living people
English rugby union players
Rugby union players from Manchester
Sale Sharks players
People educated at St. Ambrose College
Rugby union centres